Knutzen Peak is a sharp, rocky summit of elevation  standing on the north edge of Taylor Ledge in the Sentinel Range of the Ellsworth Mountains, Antarctica. It surmounts Branscomb Glacier to the east and south.

The peak was named by US-ACAN in 2006 after Donald H. Knutzen, topographic engineer with the U.S. Geological Survey in the Sentinel Range, 1979–80.

Location
US mapping in 1961, updated in 1988.

See also
 Mountains in Antarctica

Maps
 Vinson Massif.  Scale 1:250 000 topographic map.  Reston, Virginia: US Geological Survey, 1988.
 Antarctic Digital Database (ADD). Scale 1:250000 topographic map of Antarctica. Scientific Committee on Antarctic Research (SCAR). Since 1993, regularly updated.

References

External links
 Knutzen Peak SCAR Composite Gazetteer of Antarctica

Ellsworth Mountains
Mountains of Ellsworth Land